Nizar Knioua (born June 8, 1983) is a Tunisian professional basketball player.

Pro career
Knioua has played pro club basketball with Stade Nabeulien and Étoile Sportive du Sahel in the Tunisian Basketball League.

Tunisian national team
Knioua was a member of the senior men's Tunisian national basketball team that finished third at the 2009 FIBA Africa Championship, to qualify for the country's first FIBA World Championship.  Providing depth off the bench, Knioua scored 16 points and grabbed 15 rebounds, while playing in eight games for the Tunisians during the tournament.  He has also competed for the Tunisians in the 2007 FIBA Africa Championship.

References

1983 births
Living people
Basketball players at the 2012 Summer Olympics
Point guards
Olympic basketball players of Tunisia
Stade Nabeulien basketball players
Tunisian men's basketball players
Shooting guards
Étoile Sportive du Sahel basketball players
People from Nabeul
2010 FIBA World Championship players
Mediterranean Games bronze medalists for Tunisia
Mediterranean Games medalists in basketball
Competitors at the 2013 Mediterranean Games
2019 FIBA Basketball World Cup players
21st-century Tunisian people